Thomas Robb is the name of:

Thomas Robb (Ku Klux Klan), white supremacist and Ku Klux Klan leader
Tommy Robb (footballer), Scottish footballer
Tommy Robb (motorcyclist), British motorcyclist
Tom Robb, American musician

See also
Robb Thomas, American football player